Hotham House is a commercial building in Richmond, in the London Borough of Richmond upon Thames, and the UK headquarters of eBay and Gumtree. It is situated on the eastern side of the River Thames, east of Corporation Island, at the junction of the A305 and A307.

History
The original Hotham House, built in 1720, fell into disrepair and collapsed in 1960, and was demolished. The name of the building came from Admiral Sir William Hotham, who lived there in 1810.

The name was resurrected in the 1980s as part of the new Richmond Riverside development.

Construction
Construction of the redeveloped series of buildings began in 1984 and finished in 1987 in a £20m renovation funded by the Pension Fund Property Unit Trust. The buildings, designed by Quinlan Terry in a New Classical style, were opened by the Queen on 28 October 1988.

eBay opened their London office there in 2008.

See also
 One Rathbone Square, headquarters of Facebook UK
 Rob Hattrell, head of eBay UK since March 2017

References

External links
 eBay UK

1988 establishments in England
Buildings and structures on the River Thames
Buildings by Quinlan Terry
Buildings and structures in the London Borough of Richmond upon Thames
EBay
Gothic Revival architecture in London
Information technology company headquarters in the United Kingdom
Office buildings completed in 1988
Office buildings in London
Richmond, London